Hugo Dufey (born 21 June 1938) is a Chilean sports shooter. He competed in the mixed trap event at the 1976 Summer Olympics.

References

1938 births
Living people
Chilean male sport shooters
Olympic shooters of Chile
Shooters at the 1976 Summer Olympics
Place of birth missing (living people)
20th-century Chilean people